NCAA All-Tournament team is an honor bestowed at the conclusion of the NCAA Division I ice hockey tournament to the players judged to have performed the best during the championship. The team is currently composed of three forwards, two defensemen and one goaltender with additional players named in the event of a tie. Voting for the honor was conducted by the head coaches of each member team once the tournament has completed and any player regardless of their team's finish is eligible.

The All-Tournament Team began being awarded after the first championship in 1948 along with an All-Tournament Second-Team. The second team was dropped after the 1969 tournament and it has remained a single team ever since except for 1976 when no team was selected. In recent years the regional tournaments have begun to name all-tournament teams of their own, making the NCAA All-Tournament team draw only from the teams and performances in the Frozen Four.

In two years (1973 and 1992) some players who were voted onto the All-Tournament team played for schools that had their participation in the championship vacated and are no longer officially recognized with the honor but have been included here for historical reference. Vacated appearances are not included in team totals.

All-Tournament teams

1940s

1950s

1960s

1970s

1980s

1990s

2000s

2010s

2020s

* Player is no longer officially considered as part of the All-Tournament Team

All-Tournament team players by school

Multiple appearances

Second Teams

1940s

1950s

1960s

All-Tournament Second Team players by school

Multiple appearances

References 

+
All-Tournament Teams